Deudorix livia, the pomegranate playboy, is a butterfly in the family Lycaenidae. It is found in Senegal, the Gambia, Burkina Faso, Cameroon, Chad, Sudan, Uganda, Kenya, Tanzania, Somalia, Djibouti, Yemen, Saudi Arabia, United Arab Emirates, Oman, Algeria, Egypt and the eastern Mediterranean, including Greece. The habitat consists of savanna, including arid savanna.

It is a somewhat migratory species. The larvae feed on Punica granatum, Eriobotrya japonica, Acacia, Phoenix, Allium, Psidium, Gardenia and Lycopersicum species.

Subspecies
Deudorix livia livia (northern Senegal, the Gambia, Burkina Faso, northern Cameroon, Chad, Sudan, northern Uganda, northern and central Kenya, north-central Tanzania, Somalia, Djibouti, Yemen, Saudi Arabia, Oman, Egypt, eastern Mediterranean)
Deudorix livia barnetti Libert, 2005 (Oman)

References

External links
Die Gross-Schmetterlinge der Erde 13: Die Afrikanischen Tagfalter. Plate XIII 66 e

Butterflies described in 1834
Deudorigini
Deudorix